The Brimstone Cup is a soccer trophy awarded to the yearly winner of the Major League Soccer rivalry between Chicago Fire FC and FC Dallas. The Cup is awarded by the Brimstone Cup Committee to the team with the most points in games played between the two. If the two teams have the same points against each other at the end of the year (including MLS regular season and playoff games and the U.S. Open Cup), then the cup stays with the team holding it at the beginning of the year.

The cup was created during the 2001 season by the supporters' groups of both clubs, Section 8 from Chicago and the Inferno from Dallas. Its name came from a reference of the names of the two teams at the time, as FC Dallas was then known as the Dallas Burn. The name is reflected with a quote from Virgil's Aeneid engraved on the base: "The more the kindled combat rises high'r, The more with fury burns the blazing fire."  The two supporters groups contracted with the R.S. Owens Corporation, the makers of the Academy Awards since 1982, to craft the physical Brimstone Cup.

Winners

Unofficial results1

1The Brimstone Cup did not exist in the years 1998–2000. These results were determined retroactively and are unofficial.

Series results by year

References

External links
 

Chicago Fire FC
FC Dallas
Major League Soccer rivalries
Soccer cup competitions in the United States
Recurring sporting events established in 2001
2001 establishments in Texas
2001 establishments in Illinois